Lu Chien-soon (born 28 December 1959) is a Taiwanese professional golfer.

Lu won 20 tournaments in his native Taiwan. He also had success elsewhere in Asia, especially on the Asia Golf Circuit, where he won seven national opens between 1983 and 1989 and was the overall circuit champion twice, in 1983 and 1988. He also played on the Ben Hogan Tour (now Nationwide Tour) in 1992, where his best finish was T-5 at the Ben Hogan Louisiana Open. He played on the Japan Golf Tour in 2001, where his best finish as a member was T-11 at the NST Niigata Open Golf Championship, he had previously finished T-9 at the 1985 Golf Digest Tournament as a non-member.

After being sidelined for eight years (2001–08) with back problems, he returned to competition in 2009. He qualified for the Champions Tour via qualifying school. His best finishes are T-2 at the 2010 JELD-WEN Tradition, 2nd at the 2011 Montreal Championship and T-2 at the 2012 Regions Tradition. He won the 2011 Fubon Senior Open on the European Senior Tour.

Professional wins (15)

Asian Development Tour wins (1)

1Co-sanctioned by the Taiwan PGA Tour

Asia Golf Circuit wins (7)
1983 Singapore Open
1984 Benson & Hedges Malaysian Open, Thailand Open
1985 Indonesia Open
1988 Charminar Challenge Indian Open
1989 Singapore Open, Taiwan Open

ASEAN PGA Tour wins (1)

Other Asian wins (4)
1985 HP Open
1989 Rolex Masters (Singapore)
1990 Kaohsiung Open
1998 Taiwan Open

European Senior Tour wins (1)

Japan PGA Senior Tour wins (1)
2017 Japan PGA Senior Championship

Team appearances
Professional
Dunhill Cup (representing Taiwan): 1989
World Cup (representing Taiwan): 1989, 1994

References

External links

Lu Chien-soon at the Taiwan PGA official site

Taiwanese male golfers
Asian Tour golfers
Japan Golf Tour golfers
PGA Tour golfers
PGA Tour Champions golfers
Sportspeople from Taipei
1959 births
Living people